Pilar, officially the Municipality of Pilar, is a 3rd class municipality in the province of Bataan, Philippines. According to the 2020 census, it has a population of 46,239 people.

The Bataan Government Center and the historic Mount Samat National Shrine (Dambana ng Kagitingan) are both situated within the municipality in Barangays Diwa and Ala-uli, respectively.

Etymology
The town was named in the honor of the image of the Our Lady of the Pillar, hence the town was called "Pilar".

History
One of the oldest towns of Bataan, Pilar was previously part of Pampanga. Spaniards in the galleon landed in a sitio of Balanga and were greeted by the natives.

Geography

Pilar is located in eastern part of Bataan Peninsula, bordering Balanga (the provincial capital) to the north, Orion to the south, Bagac to the west, and Manila Bay to the east.

According to the Philippine Statistics Authority, the municipality has a land area of  constituting  of the  total area of Bataan.

Climate

Barangays
Pilar is politically subdivided into 19 barangays.

Demographics

In the 2020 census, Pilar had a population of 46,239.

Economy

Government
Pursuant to the Local Government Code of the Philippines", the political seat of the municipal government is located at the Municipal Hall. In the Spanish period, the Gobernadorcillo was the Chief Executive who held office in the Presidencia. During the American rule (1898–1946), the elected Mayor and local officials, including the appointed ones held office at the Municipal Hall. The legislative and executive departments perform their functions in the Sangguniang Bayan (Session Hall) and Municipal Trial Court, respectively, and are located in the Town Hall.

Elected officials
Pilar, Bataan's elected officials are Mayor Alice D. Pizarro (National Unity) and Vice Mayor Marino Caguimbal (National Unity).

The eight Sangguniang Bayan Members led by the Vice Mayor hold office at the Pilar Sangguniang Bayan Session Hall.

Tourism
Landmarks and festivals of Pilar include:

 Mount Samat Zipline — longest zipline in Luzon
 Veterans Park — located in Poblacion, Piazza Della Virgen del Pilar
 The Flaming Sword — located at Panilao, is a landmark depicting a hand holding a flaming sword up in the air, which symbolized the Filipino patriots' courage and gallantry as they face the adversary and threats to their democracy and freedom. The ESPADA was inaugurated on April 8, 1967.
 Dunsulan Falls
 Araw ng Kagitingan — celebrated every April 9

Our Lady of the Pillar Parish Church

The 1801 Our Lady of the Pillar Parish Church (Nuestra Señora del Pilar Parish Church, belongs to the Roman Catholic Diocese of Balanga (Dioecesis Balangensis) Part of the Ecclesiastical Province of San Fernando, Pampanga.

Notable personalities
 Mel Tiangco — Barangay Santa Rosa - news Anchor of GMA7
 Manuel C. Herrera — lawyer, an instructor in the University of the Philippines

Gallery

References

External links

[ Philippine Standard Geographic Code]

Municipalities of Bataan
Populated places on Manila Bay